Gimse is a surname. Notable people with the surname include:

Guro Angell Gimse (born 1971), Norwegian politician
Håvard Gimse (born 1966), Norwegian classical pianist 
Joseph Gimse (born 1957), American politician